The City Lady; Or, Folly Reclaim'd is a 1696 comedy play by the English writer Thomas Dilke. It was staged by Thomas Betterton's Company at the Lincoln's Inn Fields Theatre with a cast that included George Bright as Grumble, Cave Underhill as Bevis, John Bowman as Bellardin, John Hodgson as Lovebright, Joseph Harris as Pedanty, John Freeman as Burgersditius, William Bowen as  Jasper, Elizabeth Barry as Lady Grumble, Elizabeth Bowman as  Lucinda, Elinor Leigh as Secreta and Abigail Lawson as Fidget.

References

Bibliography
 Lowerre, Kathryn. The Lively Arts of the London Stage, 1675–1725. Routledge, 2016.
 Van Lennep, W. The London Stage, 1660-1800: Volume One, 1660-1700. Southern Illinois University Press, 1960.

1696 plays
West End plays
Comedy plays
Plays by Thomas Dilke